Chris Ellis may refer to:

 Chris Ellis (actor) (born 1956), actor who performed in movies such as My Cousin Vinny and Days of Thunder
 Chris Ellis (American football) (born 1985), free agent defensive end
 Chris Ellis (basketball) (born 1988), a basketball player for the Barangay Ginebra San Miguel team in the Philippine Basketball Association
 Chris Ellis (baseball) (born 1992), baseball player
 Chris Ellis (musician), British songwriter, composer and multi-instrumentalist

See also
Christopher Ellis (disambiguation)